One Front Street, formerly known as Shaklee Terraces, is an office skyscraper in the Financial District of San Francisco, California. The , 38-floor tower was completed in 1979. The composition of the façade closely resembles that of the Shell Building by Emil Fahrenkamp, which was built in Berlin in 1931. The Shaklee Corporation was once headquartered in the tower until the company relocated its corporate operations to east suburban Pleasanton in 1999. In 1999-2001 Scient Corporation, a dot-com era consulting firm, had its head office on the upper floors of the building, prior to its move to Southern Pacific Building.

Tenants
Tenants include:
First Republic Bank
Lookout, Inc.
Jones Lang LaSalle 
Cigna
SF Travel Association

See also

 List of tallest buildings in San Francisco

References

Further reading

External links
 One Front Street

Office buildings completed in 1979
Skyscraper office buildings in San Francisco
Financial District, San Francisco
Skidmore, Owings & Merrill buildings